Khan Jamal (July 23, 1946 – January 10, 2022), born Warren Robert Cheeseboro, was an American jazz vibraphone and marimba player.  He founded the band Sounds of Liberation in 1970.  He was described by Ron Wynn as "a proficient soloist when playing free material, jazz-rock and fusion, hard bop, or bluesy fare."

Early life
Warren Robert Cheeseboro was born in Jacksonville, Florida, on July 23, 1946.  His father, Henry McCloud, worked as an entrepreneur; his mother, Willa Mae Cheeseboro, was a stride pianist.  He was raised in Philadelphia, and began playing the vibraphone during the later part of his teenage years in the mid-1960s.  Jamal attended the Granoff School of Music and the Combs College of Music.

Career
Jamal first played for a group called Cosmic Forces during the later part of the 1960s.  He also played with The Sun Ra Arkestra.  After leaving the group, he teamed up with several other of its former members to play with Sunny Murray's group Untouchable Factor.

Jamal later co-founded Sounds of Liberation with Byard Lancaster in 1970.  Its members included Monnette Sudler (guitar), Billy Mills (bass), Dwight James (drums), and Omar Hill and Rashid Salim (percussion). The band released its only album, titled New Horizons, two years later on its own record label Dogtown.  However, it gained little impact outside Philadelphia at the time. The album was eventually reissued on Porter Records in 2010. This gave the group a new lease on life, culminating in the re-emergence of a recording made at Columbia University in 1973. It was ultimately issued in 2019 as Unreleased on Dogtown/Brewerytown.

In addition to leading his own groups, Jamal performed with Ronald Shannon Jackson's Decoding Society in the 1980s, Joe Bonner, Billy Bang, Charles Tyler and others.  His first solo album was Drum Dance to the Motherland, a live recording that was held in a small café in his hometown and first released in 1973. It was reissued by Eremite Records in 2006, with the label describing it as "the most legendary private press underground jazz album of the 1970s".  Another solo album by Jamal, Infinity (1984), was reissued by Jazz Room in 2021 and dubbed spiritual jazz by WBGO.

Jamal's style connected the two contrasting forms of free jazz and jazz fusion.  He was also known for his skill of shifting modes and moods, as well as his versatile way towards music. He was a frequent performer at the Vision Festival.

Personal life
Jamal had two sons: Khan II and Tahir.  He died on January 10, 2022, at the Chestnut Hill Hospital in Philadelphia.  He was 75, and suffered kidney failure prior to his death.

Discography

References

External links
  at All About Jazz
  at allmusic
 

1946 births
2022 deaths
20th-century African-American musicians
American jazz vibraphonists
CIMP artists
Combs College of Music alumni
Deaths from kidney failure
Musicians from Jacksonville, Florida